Rannajalgpalli Meistriliiga is the top division in the Estonian beach soccer league.

History
In 2002, some minor tournaments were held in Estonia. Since 2003, Estonian Beach Soccer Union has organized tournaments around Estonia and Estonian Championsionships are held since 2004. During 2004–2006 Estonian Championsionships were played as a one-day tournament. From 2007, the champions are determined in a season-long league system.

References

External links
Homepage

Beach soccer in Estonia
National beach soccer leagues
Beach
Beach soccer
Recurring sporting events established in 2007
2007 establishments in Estonia